KFXL may refer to:

KFXL-TV, a television station (channel 15, virtual 51) licensed to Lincoln, Nebraska, United States
KFXL-LP, a television station (channel 30) licensed to Lufkin, Texas, United States